Gorgonops (from  'Gorgon' and  'eye, face', literally 'Gorgon eye' or 'Gorgon face') is an extinct genus of gorgonopsian therapsid, of which it is the type genus. Gorgonops lived during the Late Permian (Wuchiapingian), about 260–254 million years ago in what is now South Africa.

History of discovery
The holotype of the type species, Gorgonops torvus, was one of the first therapsids discovered. It was described by Richard Owen, who also coined the name "Dinosauria" on the basis of the first known dinosaur fossils. G. torvus was also used as the type for the family Gorgonopsidae, which was described by Richard Lydekker in 1890. Five years later, in 1895, Harry Govier Seeley used this genus to establish the larger clade of Gorgonopsia. In later years, a large number of further species and genera were designated, though many of these were later determined to be synonyms.

Gorgonops is known from the Tropidostoma and most of the Cistecephalus Assemblage Zones.

Description
 
Gorgonops would have been one of the key predators across southern Africa during the Late Permian. Because the canines were so large, they would have had little trouble in penetrating the tough hides of some of the herbivores of the time, particularly pareiasaurs such as Pareiasaurus. Aside from the teeth, one of the key predatory advantages that Gorgonops had over prey was its semi-erect gait, compared to the sprawling gait exhibited by most prey animals of the time. Aside from allowing for more energy efficient locomotion, this allowed Gorgonops to travel at relatively high speeds.

Skull

Relative to body size, Gorgonops had a deep skull with a triangular profile when viewed from above. Perhaps the most distinctive features were two enlarged canine teeth that were so big ( long) they almost protruded beyond the lower jaw. To help protect these teeth, the lower jaws grew in such a shape so that the anterior (front) portion was thicker than the posterior (rear) portion. This form would have protected the enlarged canine teeth from accidental damage, and was similar in bone function to the flanges of bone of sabre-toothed cats in the Cenozoic.

Species

Gorgonops torvus (Owen, 1876) 

The type species. The holotype is an incomplete and flattened skull found at Mildenhalls, Fort Beaufort, South Africa. A number of other specimens have been found since, all from the Tropidostoma and/or Cistecephalus Assemblage Zone(s). This was a medium-sized therapsid, with a skull about 22 cm in length. It is distinguished from other species by a longer snout, and other details of the bones of the skull. Originally considered rather simple, it is actually (according to Sigogneau-Russell) a rather specialised member of the group.

Gorgonops whaitsi (Broom, 1912) 

Larger than G. torvus, with the rear of the skull wider, and other details of proportion. Originally the type species of Scymnognathus. Despite being known from a large number of specimens from the Karoo Basin, Beaufort West (Tropidostoma/Cistecephalus Assemblage Zone), the species remains poorly known. Watson and Romer placed Gorgonops and Scymnognathus in two different families, while Sigogneau-Russell placed the two species in the same genus, and considers G. whaitsi a more primitive (less derived) form.  
Synonyms: Scymnognathus whaitsi (Broom, 1912)

Gorgonops longifrons (Haughton, 1915) 
Orbit larger and snout longer than G. whaitsi, from which it may have descended. Beaufort West, Tropidostoma/Cistecephalus Assemblage Zone.
Synonyms: Gorgonognathus longifrons (Haughton, 1915)

Gorgonops? eupachygnathus (Watson, 1921) 
A flattened, incomplete, medium-sized skull, probably a juvenile of either G. torvus or G. whaitsi 
Synonyms: Leptotrachelus eupachygnathus (Watson, 1921); Leptotracheliscops eupachygnathus (Watson, 1921)

Gorgonops? dixeyi (Haughton, 1926) 
A large, incomplete and flattened skull, from Chiweta Beds, Nyassaland. Placement uncertain. Probably Low Cistecephalus Assemblage Zone equivalent (= middle of the Wuchiapingian Stage). 
Synonyms: Chiwetasaurus dixeyi (Haughton, 1926)

Gorgonops? kaiseri (Broili & Schroeder, 1934) 
Synonyms: Pachyrhinos kaiseri (Broili & Schroeder, 1934)

Classification
Below is a cladogram from Gebauer's 2007 phylogenetic analysis.

See also

 List of therapsids

References

Gorgonopsia
Prehistoric therapsid genera
Lopingian synapsids of Africa
Fossil taxa described in 1876
Taxa named by Richard Owen
Wuchiapingian genus first appearances
Wuchiapingian genus extinctions